The 2011 Tatarstan Open was a professional tennis tournament played on hard courts. It was the 2nd edition of the tournament which was part of the 2011 ITF Women's Circuit. It took place in Kazan, Russia between 8 and 14 August 2011.

WTA entrants

Seeds

 1 Rankings are as of August 1, 2011.

Other entrants
The following players received wildcards into the singles main draw:
  Ksenia Lykina
  Yulia Putintseva
  Anna Smolina
  Ekaterina Yashina

The following players received entry from the qualifying draw:
  Nigina Abduraimova
  Natela Dzalamidze
  Elena Kulikova
  Eugeniya Pashkova

Champions

Singles

 Yulia Putintseva def.  Caroline Garcia, 6–4, 6–2

Doubles

 Ekaterina Ivanova /  Andreja Klepač def.  Vitalia Diatchenko /  Alexandra Panova, w/o

External links
Official Website
ITF Search 

2011 ITF Women's Circuit
2011
2011,Tatarstan Open
2011 in Russian tennis